BWJ may refer to:

 Bawan Airport (IATA code BWJ), an airport in Bawan, Papua New Guinea
 Blind Willie Johnson, American blues and spirituals singer and guitarist 
 Bobby Witt Jr., American baseball player for the Kansas City Royals
 Láá Láá Bwamu language (ISO 639 bwj), a Gur language of Burkina Faso